Ardozyga liota is a species of moth in the family Gelechiidae. It was described by Edward Meyrick in 1904. It is found in Australia, where it has been recorded from Western Australia.

The forewings are light grey, densely and suffusedly irrorated (speckled) with white, and sprinkled with dark fuscous. The stigmata are moderate, blackish, with the plical obliquely beyond the first discal. There are some blackish dots along the posterior half of the costa. The hindwings are whitish-grey.

References

Ardozyga
Moths described in 1904
Taxa named by Edward Meyrick
Moths of Australia